Solidarity is a revolutionary multi-tendency socialist organization in the United States, associated with the journal Against the Current. Solidarity is an organizational descendant of the International Socialists, a Third Camp Marxist organization which argued that the Soviet Union was not a "degenerated workers' state" (as orthodox Trotskyists argue) but rather "bureaucratic collectivism," a new and especially repressive class society.

Solidarity describes itself as "a democratic, revolutionary socialist, feminist, anti-racist organization." Its roots are in strains of the Trotskyist tradition but has departed from many aspects of traditional Leninism and Trotskyism. It is more loosely organized than most "democratic centralist" groups, and it does not see itself as the vanguard of the working class or the nucleus of a vanguard. It was formed in 1986 from a fusion of the International Socialists, Workers Power, and Socialist Unity. The former two groups had recently been reunited in a single organization, while the last was an expelled fragment of the Socialist Workers Party (SWP).  Solidarity's name was originally in part an homage to Solidarność — an independent labor union in Communist Poland which, in Solidarity's view, had challenged the Soviet Union from the left. As of its 2011 convention, Solidarity is a sympathizing organization of the official Fourth International.

History

From the beginning, Solidarity was an avowedly pluralist radical organization that included several currents of Trotskyism, socialist-feminists who had been in the New American Movement, and veterans of earlier New Left groups such as Students for a Democratic Society. Solidarity sought to "regroup" with others to create a larger revolutionary socialist-feminist organization. They hoped to initiate a broad regroupment that would include, for example, some of the fragments of the disintegrating New Communist Movement and many more socialist-feminists and New Left veterans. Discussions of regroupment and "Left Refoundation" have been initiated between Solidarity and other left groups of varying tendencies from the 1980s to the present, but these have not led to broader fusions.

Smaller-scale regroupments have occurred, however.  During the 1990s, two organizations fused with Solidarity—the Fourth Internationalist Tendency (a group expelled from the SWP) and Activists for Independent Socialist Politics (a Socialist Action split that had previously worked in Committees of Correspondence). In 2002, members of the Trotskyist League joined Solidarity.

Strategy
Solidarity members often work in various unions for shop-floor militancy and rank-and-file democracy, and some have played key roles in maintaining and providing staff for Labor Notes magazine and Teamsters for a Democratic Union. Solidarity members have worked in many other mass movements in the US, including the anti-apartheid, reproductive rights, LGBTQ, Central American solidarity, Free Mumia Abu-Jamal, anti-war, and Global Justice movements, as well as the Green Party and the 1990s attempt at building a mass Labor Party. Solidarity members were deeply involved in Occupy Wall Street and Occupy in other cities since the Fall of 2011.

Solidarity prides itself on a "non-sectarian" approach to building these movements, and traditionally has prioritized the movements over building itself: "Too often socialist groups have seen the development of a movement not for what it is and can become, but only what it might offer in the way of recruits. We reject this conception and affirm the need for an effective class movement in and for itself, which requires new forms of action, thinking and dialogue rather than repeating the known formulas" (Regroupment & Refoundation of a U.S. Left). Solidarity publishes a bi-monthly Marxist journal, Against the Current, which is produced by an editorial board including Solidarity members and independent socialists.

In the 2010 midterm elections, Dan La Botz, a member of Solidarity and a co-editor of New Politics, ran for the United States Senate under the banner of the Socialist Party of Ohio and received 26,454 votes, or 0.69% of the total vote.

Presidential endorsements 
In 2000, Solidarity endorsed both the Green Party's Ralph Nader and the Socialist Party USA's David McReynolds for President. In August 2004, Solidarity again endorsed the now independent candidacy of Ralph Nader. In 2008, the organization endorsed Cynthia McKinney of the Green Party for President. In 2012, Solidarity urged its members to vote for the nominees of either the Green Party, Peace and Freedom, or Socialist Party USA. For 2016, the organization again endorsed Jill Stein of the Green Party for President.

In the 2020 presidential election, Solidarity initially endorsed the campaign of Howie Hawkins in November 2019, who was running as the candidate for the Socialist Party and the Green Party. The organization later decided in August 2020, after a poll of its members, to take no official position regarding the presidential election.

Notable members
 Theresa El-Amin, political activist
 Howie Hawkins, political and labor union activist associated with the Green Party
 Dan La Botz,  labor union activist, academic, journalist, and author
 Kim Moody, academic, journalist, and author

References

 
Political parties established in 1986
Fourth International (post-reunification)
Multi-tendency organizations in the United States
1986 establishments in the United States
Organizations based in Detroit